Peter Spiring (born 13 December 1950) is an English former footballer who played in the Football League playing as a winger for Bristol City, Luton Town and Hereford United, and in the North American Soccer League (NASL) for Washington Darts.

Spiring started his career at Bristol City before being sold to Liverpool for £60,000 in March 1973. He did not play a first team match at Anfield, only featuring on the bench twice, and was later sold to Luton Town for £70,000. He went on to spend eight seasons at Hereford United.

Spiring's son Reuben played first-class cricket for Worcestershire.

References

External links
 

1950 births
Living people
People from Glastonbury
English footballers
Association football midfielders
Bristol City F.C. players
Washington Darts players
Liverpool F.C. players
Luton Town F.C. players
Hereford United F.C. players
English Football League players
North American Soccer League (1968–1984) players
English expatriate sportspeople in the United States
Expatriate soccer players in the United States
English expatriate footballers